Duke Street is a private equity firm focused on leveraged buyout and growth capital investments in middle-market companies in Western Europe, particularly the UK and France.

The firm which is based in London was founded in 1988 as Hambro European Ventures, the private equity investment arm of Hambros Bank.  The principals of the firm completed a spinout from Hambros in 1998, following the bank's sale to Société Générale, and changed name of the firm to Duke Street Capital and later Duke Street.

The firm has raised approximately £2.6 billion since inception across six private equity investment funds.

Among the firm's most notable investments are Wagamama, Gala Bingo, Equity Insurance Group, Burton's Foods, Esporta Health Clubs, Getty Images, The Original Factory Shop, LM Funerals, Marie Brizard, Megabowl Oasis, Great Mills and Payzone.  In August 2015, Duke Street, with Searchlight Capital Partners, acquired controlling interests in two British construction equipment rental firms, Fork Rent and One Call Hire.

References

External links
Duke Street (company website)
Duke Street plans fresh fund.  Independent, The (London),  January 9, 2006  
Hambro capitalist ventures out the door. Independent, The (London), February 9, 1994 
Edmund Truell: CEO, Duke Street.  Euromoney, January 2003
Memorandum submitted by Duke Street Capital to the UK House of Commons Select Committee on Treasury.  June 2007

Private equity firms of the United Kingdom
Investment banking private equity groups
Financial services companies established in 1988
Financial services companies based in London